South Eastern Trains (stylised as Southeastern) was a publicly owned train operating company that operated the South Eastern Passenger Rail Franchise between November 2003, when it took over from Connex South Eastern, and 1 April 2006, when Southeastern began operating the new Integrated Kent franchise.

History
South Eastern Trains began operating the South Eastern franchise from November 2003, taking over after the franchise was removed from Connex South Eastern. On 18 January 2005 the Strategic Rail Authority issued the Integrated Kent franchise Invitation to Tender to the shortlisted bidders.

On 30 November 2005 the Department for Transport awarded Govia the Integrated Kent franchise. The services operated by South Eastern Trains transferred to Southeastern on 1 April 2006.

Services

Main lines

From London termini (London Victoria, London Bridge, London Charing Cross, London Blackfriars and London Cannon Street) unless otherwise stated;

North Kent Line – services via Dartford to Gillingham
Chatham Main Line – services to the Kent Coast via Bromley South and Chatham, dividing at Faversham to Ramsgate and Dover
Swanley to Ashford (via Maidstone East) Line
South Eastern Main Line – services the Kent Coast via Ashford and Sevenoaks
Ashford to Ramsgate (via Canterbury West) line
Ashford to Ramsgate (via Folkestone and Dover) line (Kent Coast Line)
Hastings Line (Hastings via Tunbridge Wells)
London Bridge to Tunbridge Wells (via East Croydon and Redhill) – uses part of the Brighton Main Line
Horsham to Tunbridge Wells (via Gatwick and Redhill) – uses part of the Brighton Main Line

Suburban lines
The suburban services (called ‘Metro’ in the SET timetables) ran to:
 Sevenoaks: two services – one via Grove Park, and one via Bromley South
 Hayes line
 Mid-Kent Line
 Orpington via Lewisham and via Bromley South
 Swanley
 Dartford via: North Kent Line; the Bexleyheath Line and the Dartford Loop Line.
 Bromley North Line

Rural lines
Medway Valley Line, some services extended to Tonbridge.
 Sheerness Line

Rolling stock
South Eastern Trains inherited a fleet of Class 365, Class 375, Class 411, Class 421, Class 423, Class 465 and Class 466s from Connex South Eastern.  During its tenure South Eastern Trains introduced the remaining Class 375s into service as well as the full Class 376 fleet.  All remaining Class 411, Class 421 and Class 423s were withdrawn and scrapped by October 2005, while the Class 365s were transferred to West Anglia Great Northern in 2004. Rolling stock was maintained at Ashford and Ramsgate depots.

References

External links

Official website

Defunct train operating companies
Operators of last resort
Railway companies established in 2003
Railway companies disestablished in 2006
Railway operators in London
Rail transport in Kent
2003 establishments in England
2006 disestablishments in England